The 2011 Horizon League men's basketball tournament was played Tuesday, March 1 through Tuesday, March 8. The Horizon League Network broadcast the opening rounds, which were played at the home courts of the higher seeds. The quarterfinals and semifinals were broadcast by ESPNU and took place at U.S. Cellular Arena in Milwaukee, the home court of the #1 overall seed, the Milwaukee Panthers. As Milwaukee defeated Valparaiso in its semifinal match, it secured host status for the championship game against Butler as well; the final was broadcast by ESPN/ESPN3.com.  Butler defeated Milwaukee 59–44 in the final, winning its second consecutive Horizon League  tournament title and receiving an automatic bid to the 2011 NCAA tournament.

Seeds

All Horizon League schools played in the tournament.  Teams were seeded by 2010–11 Horizon League season record, with a tiebreaker system to seed teams with identical conference records.  The top 2 teams received a bye to the semifinals.

Schedule

Bracket

First round games at campus sites of lower-numbered seeds
Second round and semifinals hosted by #1 overall seed (Milwaukee)
Championship game hosted by highest remaining seed

Honors

Matt Howard of Butler was named the tournament MVP for the second successive year.

Horizon League All-Tournament Team

References

Tournament
Horizon League men's basketball tournament
Basketball competitions in Milwaukee
Horizon League men's basketball tournament
Horizon League men's basketball tournament
2010s in Milwaukee
College basketball tournaments in Wisconsin